CRCS may refer to:
 Cedar Rapids Community Schools
 CR Classification, now ACM Computing Classification System
 Certified Revenue Cycle Specialist